The 1959 Dutch Grand Prix was a Formula One motor race held at Zandvoort on 31 May 1959. It was the ninth Dutch Grand Prix. The race was held over 75 laps of the four kilometre circuit for a race distance of 314 kilometres. It was race 3 of 9 in the 1959 World Championship of Drivers and race 2 of 8 in the 1959 International Cup for Formula One Manufacturers.

The race was won by Swedish driver Joakim Bonnier driving a BRM P25. It would be the only World Championship victory of Bonnier's fifteen-year Grand Prix career. It was also the first win for the Owen Racing Organisation, the race team of the constructor BRM, after almost a decade of effort. Bonnier won by fifteen seconds over Australian driver Jack Brabham driving a Cooper T51, to become the first Swedish driver to win a Formula One Grand Prix. Brabham's American teammate Masten Gregory was the only other driver to finish on the lead lap in his Cooper T51 in third position.

Brabham's second position expanded his championship points lead with Bonnier now second along with the Indianapolis 500 winner Rodger Ward.

The organisers wanted to have a local driver in the race, so Carel Godin de Beaufort was allowed to compete despite his car being a Porsche RSK sports car.

Classification

Qualifying

Race

Notes
 – 1 point for fastest lap

Championship standings after the race

Drivers' Championship standings

Constructors' Championship standings

 Notes: Only the top five positions are included for both sets of standings.

References

Dutch Grand Prix
Dutch Grand Prix
Grand Prix
Dutch Grand Prix